Ángel L. Bulerín Ramos (born March 19, 1949 in Fajardo, Puerto Rico) is a Puerto Rican politician. He has been a member of the Puerto Rico House of Representatives since 1992.

Early years and studies

Bulerín Ramos was born in Fajardo, Puerto Rico. He has three siblings.

Bulerín completed his elementary and high school studies in Río Grande. He then obtained a bachelor's degree in business administration, with a major in Accounting and Finances.

Public service career

In 1968, Bulerín began working at the Personnel Office of the Government of Puerto Rico, specifically in the Retirement Division. After that, he worked in the Department of Employment (1969-1975) and the Health Department (1977-1984).

Political career

From January 1977 to December 1984, Bulerín served as member of the Municipal Legislature of Río Grande, where he presided the Treasury Commission.

In 1984, he ran for Mayor of Río Grande for the New Progressive Party (PNP), and was elected at the 1984 general elections.

In 1992, Bulerín decided to run for the House of Representatives to represent District 37. After winning a spot at the 1992 PNP primaries, he was elected at the general election that same year. Bulerín has been reelected seven times (1996, 2000, 2004, 2008, 2012, 2016, 2020).

Personal life

Bulerín is married to Ramonita Colón. They have two children (Omarys and Angel Luis), and four grandchildren (Andrea, Angélica, Adriana and Alejandra). The 4 grandchildren are great students. The older one, Andrea Sofía is a great ballerina, Angélica is a volleyball player and Adriana and Alejandra are soccer players....

References

External links
Angel Bulerín Biography

|-

Living people
1949 births
Mayors of places in Puerto Rico
New Progressive Party (Puerto Rico) politicians
New Progressive Party members of the House of Representatives of Puerto Rico
People from Fajardo, Puerto Rico